Richard Hines (June 25, 1792November 20, 1851) was a Congressional Representative from North Carolina; born in Tarboro, North Carolina on June 25, 1792; studied law; was admitted to the bar in 1816 and practiced in Raleigh, North Carolina; member of the State house of commons, 1824; elected to the Nineteenth Congress (March 4, 1825 – March 3, 1827); unsuccessful candidate for reelection in 1826 to the Twentieth Congress; resumed the practice of law in Raleigh, N.C., and died there November 20, 1851; interment in the Old City Cemetery, Raleigh, N.C.

See also
Nineteenth United States Congress

External links 
Entry in US Congressional Biographical db

Members of the North Carolina House of Representatives
Burials at City Cemetery (Raleigh, North Carolina)
1851 deaths
Year of birth missing
Jacksonian members of the United States House of Representatives from North Carolina
19th-century American politicians
People from Tarboro, North Carolina